Cyrtodactylus dayangbuntingensis is a species of gecko endemic to peninsular Malaysia.

References

Cyrtodactylus
Reptiles described in 2019